The Kian is an unmanned Iranian military drone. It can travel more than 1,000 km and climb up to 5,000 meters above sea level.

The Kian can locate and engage targets from a great distance.

It was designed, manufactured and tested by experts from the Iranian Army's Air Force Drone Unit.

References 

 

Unmanned military aircraft of Iran
Iranian military aircraft
Aircraft manufactured in Iran
Islamic Republic of Iran Air Force
Post–Cold War military equipment of Iran
Unmanned aerial vehicles of Iran